The rule of sevens, in English common law, establishes three age brackets for determining a young person's capacity to be responsible for torts and crimes. Children under the age of seven cannot be held to have capacity, while there is a rebuttable presumption that a minor aged 7 to 14 lacks capacity, while for those aged 14 to 21 there is a rebuttable presumption of capacity. The rule of sevens is also used in determining capacity to give informed assent to participate in clinical trials.

References

Common law